Susana (Susana, demonio y carne or The Devil and the Flesh) is a 1951 film directed by Luis Buñuel. It is the story of a girl of questionable mental stability who escapes from incarceration and ends up at a plantation where she disrupts a working family's daily routines and chemistry.

Plot
Susana is full of the unique touches of Buñuel's surrealism. The heroine, Susana (Rosita Quintana), is a beautiful inmate of a reformatory. When first seen, Susana is thrown into a solitary cell with bats and rats for misbehaving and the correction officer says Imagine, she's been here two years and is worse than ever!. In her cell, she asks for God's help, facing a shadow of the cross formed by the window bars from where a spider crawls away.  She manages to pull the bars across the window away from the rotting walls and escapes into the rainy night.

She ends up at a ranch who gives her shelter after she gives an invented history. She soon entices the men, who become obsessed with possessing her and end up fighting over her: Jesús, the ranch foreman; Alberto, the family's teenage son; and Guadalupe, Alberto's father, "a God-fearing man and the faithful husband of the beautiful, patient Dona Carmen".

Analysis

Gilles Deleuze in his work Cinema 1: The Movement Image talks about the impulse-image in Susana "that achieves the complete exhaustion of a milieu: mother, servant, son and father. The impulse must be exhaustive. It is not even sufficient to say that the impulse contents itself with what a milieu gives it or leaves to it. This contentment is not resignation, but a great joy in which the impulse rediscovers its power of choice, since it is, at the deepest level, the desire to change milieu, to seek a new milieu to explore, to dislocate, enjoying all the more what this milieu offers, however low, repulsive or disgusting it may be. The joys of the impulse cannot be measured against the affect, that is, against the intrinsic qualities of the possible object."

Cast
 Fernando Soler		Don Guadalupe
 Rosita Quintana		Susana
 Víctor Manuel Mendoza	Jesús
 María Gentil Arcos	Felisa
 Luis López Somoza	        Alberto
 Matilde Palou	        Doña Carmen
 Rafael Icardo	        Don Severiano, veterinary
 Enrique del Castillo	Reformatory official

References

External links

1951 films
1951 drama films
Mexican drama films
1950s Spanish-language films
Mexican black-and-white films
Films directed by Luis Buñuel
1950s Mexican films